Lokshahir Ram Joshi (People's Poet Ram Joshi) also called Matawala Shair Ram Joshi in Hindi, is a 1947 Marathi biopic film of the poet Ram Joshi, written by G. D. Madgulkar, directed by Baburao Painter and co-directed by V. Shantaram.  Shantaram had given the direction to Painter but had to complete the film when Painter fell ill during production. Produced under the Rajkamal Kalamandir banner, it is also referred to as Lok Shahir Ramjoshi. The story  writer was G.D. Madgulkar, who is cited as the "first specialist film writer" in Marathi cinema. This film was his first "full-fledged writing assignment", wherein he wrote the story, screenplay, dialogue and lyrics. It was also his debut as a screenplay writer. The film starred Jayaram Shiledar as Ram Joshi and Hansa Wadkar as Baya. The rest of the cast included Shakuntala Paranjpye, Parashuram, Sudha Apte and G. D. Madgulkar.

The film, termed as the "Classic Marathi Tamasha musical" was a biopic of the poet, Kirtan, and lavani performer Ram Joshi  (1758-1812), set in the Peshwa period.

Plot
Ram Joshi is a Brahmin poet, who through his love of poetry and dance starts associating with the tamasha artists. He falls in love with the tamasha dancer Baya (Hansa Wadkar). The artists are of low-caste, and Joshi's interacting with them brings censure and he is outlawed by the other members of his caste. The film follows his descent into alcoholism and his redemption from it through poetry.

Cast

Marathi
 Jayaram Shiledar as Ram Joshi
 Hansa Wadkar as Baya
 Shakuntala Paranjpye
 Parashuram
 G. D. Madgulkar
 Sudha Apte
 Samant
 Gundopant Walavalkar
 Jayaram Desai
 Kanase
 Sawalram
 Vaidya
 Abhyankar

Hindi
 Manmohan Krishan
 Hansa Wadkar
 Shakuntala Paranjpye
 Sudha Apte
 Jairam Desai

Review and Box Office
Lokshahir Ram Joshi in Marathi Cinema became one of the "biggest post-war successes", starting the trend for the "tamasha genre" films. One of the reasons cited for the  success of the film in both Marathi and Hindi,  were the songs written by Madgulkar. He went on to work for other major Marathi  film-makers like Raja Paranjpye, Ram Gabale, Datta Dharmadhikari and Anant Mane. V. Shantaram later used him as a story writer for Do Aankhen Barah Haath (1957). The film made use of the "vibrant lavnis" and "sawaal-jawabs" (musical question and answers), which is stated to have become a "trend-setter". As cited by Narwekar and Kul, the music and dances "enthralled" the audiences.

Soundtrack
The music was composed by Vasant Desai, with lyrics by the poet Ram Joshi and Madgulkar.

Song List

Remakes
A Telugu and Tamil version, produced by Vasireddy Narayana Rao and directed by P. Pullaiah was made in 1957 called Jayabheri. The Telugu version won the 1959 Certificate of Merit for Best Feature Film in Telugu

References

External links

Songs Audio at Sounds of Sonawade-Vasant Desai

1940s Marathi-language films
1947 films
1940s Hindi-language films
Indian black-and-white films
Films directed by V. Shantaram
Films scored by Vasant Desai
1940s multilingual films
Indian multilingual films